The 137th Special Operations Group is an associate unit of the Oklahoma Air National Guard stationed at Will Rogers Air National Guard Base. If activated for federal service, the group is gained by Air Force Special Operations Command.

The group was first activated during World War II as the 404th Fighter Group flying Republic P-47 Thunderbolts.  The group served in the European Theater of Operations from May 1944 until the end of the war.  It provided close air support to ground troops following Operation Overlord, the Normandy landings. It earned a Distinguished Unit Citation, French Croix de Guerre with Palm and Belgian Fourragere before inactivating in the fall of 1945.

The group was redesignated the 137th Fighter Group and allotted to the National Guard in 1946, with squadrons in Oklahoma and Kansas.  During the Korean War, it was activated and deployed to France as the 137th Fighter-Bomber Group, where it opened Chaumont Air Base.

The unit was replaced in France by a regular unit and returned without personnel or equipment to state control.  In 1955, it converted from the fighter bomber to the fighter interceptor mission, and two years later lost its squadrons in Tulsa and in Kansas to new fighter groups.

From 1961 until it was inactivated in 1975, the group engaged in strategic and tactical airlift.

The group was activated again in 1992 and converted to the air refueling mission in 2008.

Overview 
During World War II, as the 404th Fighter Group flying Republic P-47 Thunderbolts, it provided close air support to troops following Operation Overlord, the Normandy landing until the close of the war. During the Korean War, as the 136th Fighter-Bomber Group it was activated and deployed to France. The unit later engaged fighter operations, strategic and tactical airlift before being redesignated as an air refueling wing.

Units 
The 137th Special Operations Group consists of the following units:

 137th Aeromedical Evacuation Squadron
 137th Special Operations Support Squadron
 185th Special Operations Squadron
 189th Intelligence Squadron
 285th Special Operations Intelligence Squadron
 138th Combat Training Flight

History

World War II

Training in the United States

The group was first activated at Key Field, Mississippi as the 404th Bombardment Group (Dive) with the 620th, 621st, 622d Bombardment Squadron and 623d Bombardment Squadrons assigned.  The group drew its initial cadre from the 48th Bombardment Group, and was equipped with a mix of Vultee A-35 Vengeance and Douglas A-24 Banshee dive bombers and (briefly) Bell P-39 Airacobra fighter-bombers.  In July, the group moved to Congaree Army Air Field, South Carolina, where, along with all other single engine dive bomber units of the Army Air Forces, it reorganized in August, becoming the 405th Fighter-Bomber Group. Fighter groups were organized with three squadrons, rather than the four of bombardment groups, so the 623d Squadron was disbanded.

Between November 1943 and January 1944, most of the aircrew assigned to the group were detached for training on fighter aircraft and replaced by fighter qualified pilots, many of whom had been serving as instructors in various fighter training units.

Combat in Europe

Upon arrival in the European Theater of Operations the group became part of IX Fighter Command.  The group's station in England was RAF Winkton, an unimproved field, where it received 75 Republic P-47 Thunderbolts by 16 April.  By 1 May, it was ready to fly its first combat mission, a fighter sweep over Normandy. Later in the month, it began to fly Noball missions, strikes on V-1 flying bomb launching sites. For the rest of the month, the 404th helped prepare for Operation Overlord, the Normandy invasion by bombing and strafing targets in northern France.  The group's squadrons provided top cover for landings in Normandy on 6 and 7 June 1944.

On 6 July the 404th moved across the Channel to an Advanced Landing Ground at Chippelle Airfield, France. The group also flew interdiction and escort missions, strafing and bombing such targets as troop concentrations, railroads, highways, bridges, fuel and ammunition dumps, armored vehicles, docks, and tunnels, and covering the operations of Boeing B-17 Flying Fortresses, Consolidated B-24 Liberators, and Martin B-26 Marauders that bombed factories, airdromes, marshaling yards, and other targets.  On 6 and 7 June, the group provided top cover for the Normandy landings.  The 404th provided close air support to ground troops, supporting the Allied breakthrough at Saint-Lô from 29 through 31 July 1944, provided continuous cover for four allied armored divisions despite severe losses.  For this action the group received the French Croix de Guerre with Palm from the French government.

On 10 September 1944 the group flew three armed reconnaissance missions, attacking factories, rolling stock and communications centers despite adverse weather and heavy flak, for which it was awarded the Distinguished Unit Citation. On 28 September 1944, 2/Lt John W. Wainwright was credited with destroying six enemy aircraft on a single mission, three of which were knocked down in a midair collision during a dogfight.

The 404th provided close air support to ground troops, supporting the drive through Belgium and the Netherlands in September 1944. For its actions supporting the liberation of Belgium, the group was thrice cited in the Order of the Day by the Belgian government, earning it the Belgian Fourragere. From 21 to 25 January 1945, it attacked German armor and transportation withdrawing from the Battle of the Bulge, and claimed to have destroyed or damaged over 1000 enemy vehicles.

During February 1945, it assisted with the reduction of German forces west of the Rhine and the widening of the Remagen bridgehead east of the Rhine during March 1945.

When the war in Europe ended, the group assisted with the disarming of the Luftwaffe and dismantling of the German aircraft industry

Following its return to the United States, the unit was reassigned to the Third Air Force in the United States and prepared for deployment to Okinawa to take part in planned Invasion of Japan. When the Atomic bombings of Hiroshima and Nagasaki took place and the Pacific War suddenly ended, these plans were canceled. Most personnel either separated from the military or were reassigned to other units, while a skeleton staff arrived at Drew Field, Florida on 1 September. The unit was inactivated on 9 November 1945.

Oklahoma Air National Guard 
The wartime 404th Fighter-Bomber Group was redesignated as the 137th Fighter Group and allotted to the National Guard on 24 May 1946. It was organized at Westheimer Airport, Norman, Oklahoma and was extended federal recognition on 18 December 1947. It was assigned to the Tenth Air Force of Air Defense Command.

The 137th Fighter Group was assigned the 185th Fighter Squadron at Westheimer, the 125th Fighter Squadron at Tulsa Municipal Airport and the 127th Fighter Squadron at Wichita Municipal Airport, Kansas as its operational units, all equipped with North American F-51D Mustang fighters. The Group's mission was air defense.

In April 1949, a tornado struck the Westheimer. The damage was considered too extensive for economical repair and the decision was made to move the 137th Fighter Group and its 185th Fighter Squadron to Will Rogers World Airport in Oklahoma City in an area used as an Army Air Forces station during World War II. The move was accomplished on 6 September 1949. In 1950 the 125th traded its old Mustangs for Republic F-84 Thunderjets.

Korean War federalization 
The 137th was federalized on 10 October 1950 due to the Korean War. The group was assigned to Tactical Air Command, and redesignated 137th Fighter-Bomber Group.  Under the wing base organization, the 137th Fighter-Bomber Wing was activated and the group was assigned to it. The 125th and 127th Fighter Squadrons (flying different models of the F-84) were activated with the group, while the 128th Fighter Squadron of the Georgia Air National Guard, with P-47s, took the place of the 185th Fighter Squadron, which remained under state control until the following year. The 137th was programmed to reinforce United States Air Forces Europe (USAFE) at Chaumont Air Base, France once the wing initially programmed to be stationed there. the 136th Fighter-Bomber Wing, was diverted to Korea. However, it was August 1951 before France gave permission to establish an "interim tent camp" at Chaumont, which had runways built in 1944 and a limited parking area.

By 27 November, the group's squadrons assembled at Alexandria Air Force Base, Louisiana, for conversion training in newer F-84G Thunderjets. The need to transfer pilots and support personnel to Korea and delays in deliveries of the group's F-84Gs required the complete training cycle to be repeated twice and the group did not complete its transition to the G model of the Thunderject until February 1952. While at Alexandria, the group's pilots participated in USAF Project 7109, which sent them temporarily to Far East Air Forces, where they acquired actual combat experience before returning to the States.  Due to the delays, most of the activated National Guard airmen remained behind when the group deployed to Europs and were released from active duty without shipping overseas.

With mostly regular Air Force personnel and all the delays behind them, the group's planes departed Louisiana on 5 May 1952 for Europe. The air echelon ferried brand new F-84Gs across the Atlantic. The 137th's aircraft diverted at the last moment to Landstuhl Air Base and Neubiberg Air Base in West Germany arriving on 13 May. The official explanation for this change was that repairs to the Chaumont runway were needed, but the F-84G was capable of carrying nuclear weapons, which were opposed by some French political parties and it was not until 25 June that the French government permitted the group to move to Chaumont. It was first USAF fighter group to be based permanently in France (and the only F-84G unit). The 137th ended its active-duty tour in France two weeks later in July 1952 and its mission, personnel and equipment were transferred to the 48th Fighter Group, which was simultaneously activated.

Fighter-Interceptor mission 

Reforming after their active duty service, the group was reformed with both the 125th and 185th squadrons being released from Federal Service and being reassigned by 1 January 1953.  The 137th was gained by Tactical Air Command (TAC), and the squadrons were again equipped with Mustangs again, due to the shortage of jet aircraft in the United States (almost all were in Korea).  In the spring of 1953 they received reworked F-80A Shooting Star aircraft, brought up to F-80C standards.

In 1955 the group became the 137th Fighter-Interceptor Group and was given a fighter-interceptor mission in Air Defense Command (ADC).  On 1 August 1957 the 137th Wing reorganized to mirror ADC's active duty organization as the 137th Air Defense Wing, while at each location with a subordinate squadron became a Fighter Group (Air Defense), adding support units to the fighter squadron at the location.

The 137th was equipped with North American F-86D Sabres in 1958. Their F-80s were transferred to the Federal Aviation Administration (FAA) for various experimental testing activities.  The group also assumed ADC runway alert program on a 24-hour basis.  In June 1959 the squadron traded their F-86Ds for the upgraded F-86L Sabre with uprated engines and new electronics.

Strategic airlift 
In April 1961, Military Air Transport Service became the gaining command for the 137th, trading in its Sabres for Boeing C-97 Stratofreighter transports. The unit was redesignated the 137th Air Transport Group. Throughout the 1960s, the 125th flew long-distance transport missions in support of Air Force requirements, frequently sending aircraft to the Caribbean, Europe, Australia, Hawaii, Japan and the Philippines.  During the Berlin Crisis of 1961, the group flew missions to Europe, although it was not called to active duty as a unit. It flew missions to the Dominican Republic during the Dominican Civil War there in 1965 and with the increasing American involvement also began flying missions to Southeast Asia.

Part of the 137th Air Transport Group mission was a specially equipped C-97E, 51-0224, the "Miss Oklahoma City" also known as the "Talking Bird".  From 1961 though 1963 the aircraft was used as an airborne command post to maintain constant secure communications between the nation's capital and President John F. Kennedy during his visits to foreign countries. The C-97s were retired in February 1968 replaced by Douglas C-124C Globemaster II transports.

Tactical airlift 

In 1975 the group became the 137th Tactical Airlift Wing and re-equipped with Lockheed C-130A Hercules tactical airlifters.  It was inactivated in February 1975 and its units assigned directly to the 137th Tactical Airlift Wing.

In subsequent years the 137th served in humanitarian missions worldwide. During the 1990s the 185th provided Counter-drug support coordinated through the Oklahoma Bureau of Narcotics and Dangerous Drugs. As of mid-2001, numerous drug enforcement operations have resulted in the destruction of 7.2 million marijuana plants, estimated 4.1 billion dollars in destroyed drugs, 814 arrests, 165 seized weapons, and 1.1 million dollars in currency and assets seized.

The 137th provided operational support during the 1991 Gulf War, and contributed logistical assistance in Bosnia in the late 1990s.  Group personnel from the 137th Airlift Wing aided New Mexico ranchers faced with livestock devastation after severe winter storms covered the grasslands with snow, averting near disaster to New Mexico's livestock industry.

Current status 
In its 2005 BRAC Recommendations, the Department of Defense relocating the group to Tinker Air Force Base as an associate of the 507th Operations Group of Air Force Reserve Command as the 137th Operations Group. The 137th's C-130H aircraft were distributed to the Texas Air National Guard's 136th Airlift Wing at NAS JRB Fort Worth, Texas, and the Missouri Air National Guard's 139th Airlift Wing at Rosecrans Air National Guard Base, Missouri.

From October 2008 until 2015, 137th Group aircrews jointly operated the Boeing KC-135R Stratotanker aircraft at TinkerB with the aircrews of the Air Force Reserve 465th Air Refueling Squadron.  The 137th Air Refueling Wing is planned to transition from Air Mobility Command claimancy as a KC-135R unit at Tinker Air Force Base, to Air Force Special Operations Command claimancy flying the MC-12W surveillance variant of the Beechcraft C-12 Huron, returning flight operations to Will Rogers Air National Guard Base at Will Rogers World Airport. The wing was planned to be renamed the 137th Special Operations Wing.

Lineage
 Constituted as the 404th Bombardment Group (Dive) on 25 January 1943
 Activated on 4 February 1943
 Redesignated 404th Fighter-Bomber Group on 10 August 1943
 Redesignated 404th Fighter Group, Single Engine on 30 May 1944
 Inactivated on 9 November 1945
 Redesignated 137th Fighter Group, Single Engine and allotted to the National Guard
 Organized on 1 September 1947
 Extended federal recognition on 18 December 1947
 10 October 1950: Federalized and ordered to active service
 Inactivated, released from active duty and returned to Oklahoma state control on 10 July 1952
 Activated on 10 July 1952
 Redesignated 137th Fighter-Interceptor Group on 1 July 1955
 Redesignated 137th Fighter Group (Air Defense) on 1 August 1957
 Redesignated 137th Air Transport Group, Heavy on 1 April 1961
 Redesignated 137th Military Airlift Group on 1 January 1966
 Redesignated 137th Tactical Airlift Group on 10 December 1974
 Inactivated on 9 February 1975
 Redesignated 137th Operations Group
 Activated 16 March 1992

Assignments 
 III Fighter Command, 4 February 1943
 IX Fighter Command, 4 April 1944
 84th Fighter Wing,
 Attached to: IX Tactical Air Command, 1 August 1944
 XXIX Tactical Air Command, 26 October 1944
 64th Fighter Wing, 16 January – 2 August 1945
 III Fighter Command, 1 September – 9 November 1945
 71st Fighter Wing, 18 December 1947
 63d Fighter Wing, 23 May 1948
 137th Fighter-Bomber Wing, 26 October 1950 – 10 July 1952
 137th Fighter-Bomber Wing (later 137th Fighter-Interceptor Wing, 137th Air Defense Wing, 137th Air Transport Wing, 137th Military Airlift Wing, 137th Tactical Airlift Wing), 10 July 1952 – 9 February 1975
 137th Airlift Wing (later 137th Air Refueling Wing), 16 March 1992 – 30 September 2015
 137th Special Operations Wing, 1 October 2015 - Present

Components

World War II 
 455th Fighter Squadron: 1 December 1943 – 12 February 1944
 620th Bombardment Squadron (later 506th Fighter-Bomber Squadron, 506th Fighter Squadron): 4 February 1943 – 9 November 1945
 621st Bombardment Squadron (later 507th Fighter-Bomber Squadron, 507th Fighter Squadron): 4 February 1943 – 9 November 1945
 622d Bombardment Squadron (later 508th Fighter-Bomber Squadron, 508th Fighter Squadron): 4 February 1943 – 9 November 1945
 623d Bombardment Squadron: 4 February – 15 August 1943

Air National Guard 
 117th Fighter-Interceptor Squadron: 23 February 1957 – 10 April 1958
 125th Fighter Squadron (later 125th Fighter-Bomber Squadron, 125th Fighter-Interceptor Squadron): 18 December 1947 – 10 July 1952, 10 July 1952 – 1 August 1957
 127th Fighter Squadron (later 127th Fighter-Bomber Squadron, 127th Fighter-Interceptor Squadron): 1 September 1947 – 10 July 1952; 10 July 1952 – 1 August 1957
 128th Fighter Squadron (later 128th Fighter-Bomber Squadron): 10 October 1950 – 10 July 1952
 154th Fighter Squadron: 1 September 1947 – 10 October 1950
 185th Fighter Squadron (later 185th Fighter-Bomber Squadron, 185th Fighter-Interceptor Squadron, 185th Air Transport Squadron, 185th Military Airlift Squadron, 185th Tactical Airlift Squadron, 185th Air Refueling) Squadron): 18 December 1947 – 10 October 1950; 1 January 1953 – 9 February 1975, 16 March 1992 – 2015
 185th Special Operations Squadron: 1 October 2015 - Present

Stations 

 Key Field, Mississippi, 4 February 1943
 Congaree Army Air Field, South Carolina, 5 July 1943
 Burns Army Air Field, Oregon, 4 September 1943
 Myrtle Beach Army Air Field, South Carolina, 13 November 1943 – 12 March 1944
 RAF Winkton (AAF-414), England, 4 April 1944
 Chippelle Airfield (A-5), France, 6 July 1944
 Bretigny Airfield (A-48), France, 29 August 1944
 Juvincourt Airfield (A-68), France, 13 September 1944
 Sint-Truiden Airfield (A-92), Belgium, 4 October 1944
 Kelz Airfield (Y-54), Germany, 30 March 1945
 Fritzlar Airfield (Y-86), Germany, 12 April 1945

 AAF Station Stuttgart/Echterdingen (R-50), Germany, 23 June – 2 August 1945
 Drew Field, Florida, 1 September – 9 November 1945
 Westheimer Airport, Oklahoma, 18 December 1947
 Will Rogers World Airport, Oklahoma, 6 September 1949
 Alexandria Air Force Base, Louisiana, 27 November 1950 – 4 May 1952
 Chaumont-Semoutiers Air Base, France, 13 May 1952 – 10 July 1952
 Will Rogers World Airport, Oklahoma, 10 July 1952
 Will Rogers World Airport, Oklahoma, 16 March 1992
 Tinker Air Force Base, Oklahoma, 1 October 2008 – 30 September 2015
 Will Rogers Air National Guard Base, Oklahoma, 1 October 2015 - Present

Aircraft 

 Vultee A-35 Vengeance (1943)
 Douglas A-24 Banshee (1943)
 Bell P-39 Airacobra (1943)
 Republic P-47 Thunderbolt (1944–1945)
 North American F-51D Mustang, 1947–1951, 1953
 RF-51D Mustang, 1951–1952
 Lockheed RF-80A Shooting Star, 1952–1953
 Lockheed F-80C Shooting Star, 1953–1958
 North American F-86D Sabre, 1958–1959
 North American F-86L Sabre, 1959–1961
 Boeing C-97C Stratofreighter, 1961–1963
 Boeing C-97G Stratofreighter, 1961–1968
 Douglas C-124C Globemaster II, 1968–1975
 Lockheed C-130A Hercules, 1975–1979
 Lockeed C-130H Hercules, 1979–2008
 Boeing KC-135R Stratotanker, 2008 – 2015
 Beechcraft MC-12W, 2015 - Present

Awards and Campaigns

See also 

 502d Air Service Group Support Organization for 404th Fighter Group

References

Notes

Citations

Bibliography

 
 
 
 
 
 
 
 
 
 * 

 Further reading

External links 
 
  (Memorial at Saint-Martin-de-Blagny to fallen 404th pilots.  In French.)

Groups of the United States Air National Guard
Military units and formations in Oklahoma
Military units and formations established in 1943
Operations groups of the United States Air Force